Neurothemis terminata is a species of dragonfly in family Libellulidae. Neurothemis terminata is a widespread and often common species which can occur in man-made habitats, from Peninsular Malaysia and Japan to the Lesser Sundas in Indonesia.

Male N. terminata have red colour on its body and wings, while the female have yellowish colour. The adult has 8-11 cm body length.

References

Libellulidae
Insects of Asia
Insects described in 1911